The Te Putanga Toi Arts Access Awards, formerly called the Big 'A' Awards, are New Zealand arts awards, presented annually by Arts Access Aotearoa.

Introduced in 2007, they were initially called the Big 'A' Awards, but were renamed as Te Putanga Toi Arts Access Awards in 2018. The awards recognise the contribution of individuals and organisations in providing access to the arts, and celebrate the achievements of artists with lived experience of disability or mental ill-health. There are currently seven awards, including a Community Partnership award, a Museum award, two Arts in Corrections awards, the Arts Access Artistic Achievement Award for artists with a disability or lived experience of mental ill-health, and an Arts Access Accolade, presented to someone who has made a significant contribution to accessibility. The award winners are selected by a panel of judges, except for the Arts Accolade, which is selected by the staff and board of Arts Access Aotearoa.

Up until 2020 the trophies for each award were made by Robert Rapson. Hedy Ankers, of Wellington Potters, took over after Rapson's death.

2021 awards 
The 2021 awards were held at Museum of New Zealand Te Papa Tongarewa in Wellington on 5 July 2021. This year a new award was introduced, the Arts Access Creative New Zealand Media Award.

2020 awards 
The awards for 2020 were presented online.

References 

New Zealand awards